Cecilia Maria Elisabeth de Ranitz (1880-1970) was a Dutch painter.

Biography 
Ranitz was born on 2 June 1880 in Utrecht. She studied with Hendrik Maarten Krabbé, Klaas van Leeuwen, and Martin Monnickendam. 

Her work was included in the 1939 exhibition and sale Onze Kunst van Heden (Our Art of Today) at the Rijksmuseum in Amsterdam.

Ranitz had also studied medicine and had received her PhD in 1941. In 1956 she was appointed Professor of internal medicine at the Airlangga University in Surabaya, East Java.

Ranitz died on 9 April 1970 in Amsterdam.

References

External links
image of Ranitz's work at RKD

1880 births
1970 deaths
Artists from Utrecht
20th-century Dutch women artists